Hardavinder Singh Sandhu (born 6 September 1986) is an Indian singer, actor and former cricketer who works in Punjabi and Hindi films. His first song was Tequilla Shot, and he gained popularity with Soch (2013) and Joker (2014), which were written by Jaani and music composed by B Praak. Sandhu made his acting debut in Yaaran Da Katchup (2014). His song "Soch" was remade for the 2016 Bollywood film Airlift. His song "Naah" was remade for the film Bala as "Naah Goriye" with singer Swasti Mehul. He is a notable alumnus of The British Co-Ed High school, Patiala.

In 2021, he made his Hindi film debut with Kabir Khan's sports-drama 83 which is based on 1983 Cricket World Cup. He has since starred in spy action drama Code Name: Tiranga (2022).

Early life and career 
Sandhu played cricket for over a decade as a fast bowler, but suffered a severe elbow injury, forcing him to give up the game in 2007. He shifted his focus from sports to singing, took vocal training for eighteen months and performed his first album "This is Harrdy Sandhu" in 2011 composed by V. Grooves. He released the video of song "Tequilla Shot" from album but the song and album didn't perform so well. He was disappointed and decided to leave singing if his next single track did not perform well. He met lyricist Jaani and Music Director B Praak to make the song named "Soch" which was released in 2013.

He is married to Zenith Sandhu who also featured in the song "Backbone".

He made his debut as an actor with Punjabi movie "Yaaran Da Katchup" in 2014. The movie proved to be average. But he kept giving hits as a singer with tracks such as "Joker","Backbone", "Horn Blow","Yaar Ni Milya" with Jaani and B Praak, which proved to be big hits.

Later in 2017 he released track "Naah" featuring Nora Fatehi, with lyrics by Jaani and music by B Praak. In 2018 after huge success of Naah, he released "Kya Baat Ay" with the same team, which also proved to be a huge hit. Both songs have since crossed 500+ million views on YouTube individually.

In later years, he released some other tracks such as "Superstar", "Dance Like", "Jee Karda", "Titliaan Warga", which were also hits. He also sang some tracks in Bollywood films such as "Chandigarh" from Good Newwz and "Naah Goriye" from Bala.

He made his Bollywood debut as an actor with sports drama film 83, which is based on India's victorious campaign at the 1983 Cricket World Cup. He played the role of former Team India fast bowler Madan Lal, who was an important part of the 1983 world cup winning team. In November 2021, he released new single "Bijlee Bijlee", written and composed by Jaani and music by B Praak released by Jaani's music label Desi Melodies. The song along with its hook dance step became viral on Instagram reels with more than 1.4 million reels. In August 2022, Puma signed Harrdy Sandhu as their newest brand ambassador.

Discography

Albums

Single

Film

Filmography

Awards and nominations

References

External links 

Punjabi-language singers
Punjabi music
Bhangra (music) musicians
Male actors in Punjabi cinema
Indian male singers
1988 births
Living people
Sportspeople from Patiala